For articles on Irish television in the 1980s please see:
1980 in Irish television
1981 in Irish television
1982 in Irish television
1983 in Irish television
1984 in Irish television
1985 in Irish television
1986 in Irish television
1987 in Irish television
1988 in Irish television
1989 in Irish television

 
Television in Ireland